Macromolecular Chemistry and Physics is a biweekly peer-reviewed scientific journal covering polymer science. It publishes full papers, talents, trends, and highlights in all areas of polymer science, from chemistry to physical chemistry, physics, and materials science.

History
Macromolecular Chemistry and Physics was established in 1947 as Die Makromolekulare Chemie/Macromolecular Chemistry by Hermann Staudinger and obtained its current title in 1994. According to the Journal Citation Reports, the journal has a 2020 impact factor of 2.527.

See also
 Macromolecular Rapid Communications, 1979
 Macromolecular Theory and Simulations, 1992
 Macromolecular Materials and Engineering, 2000
 Macromolecular Bioscience, 2001
 Macromolecular Reaction Engineering, 2007

References

External links 
 

Physical chemistry journals
Materials science journals
Publications established in 1947
Biweekly journals
Wiley-VCH academic journals
English-language journals